Mnesarchaea is a genus of "New Zealand  primitive moths" in the family Mnesarchaeidae. This genus is endemic to New Zealand.

Taxonomy
This genus was first described by Edward Meyrick in 1885.

Species
These species belong to the genus Mnesarchaea:
 Mnesarchaea fallax Philpott, 1927
 Mnesarchaea fusca Philpott, 1922
 Mnesarchaea hudsoni Gibbs, 2019
 Mnesarchaea paracosma Meyrick, 1885

References

Moths of New Zealand
Mnesarchaeoidea
Endemic fauna of New Zealand
Moth genera
Taxa named by Edward Meyrick
Endemic moths of New Zealand